Local &/or General is the second studio album by Australian new wave rock band Models, which peaked at #30 on the Australian albums chart. It was released in October 1981 on Mushroom Records with Stephen W Tayler producing.

Early in 1981, Janis Friedenfelds was replaced on drums by Mark Hough (a.k.a. Buster Stiggs) from New Zealand band The Swingers. Prior to flying to the United Kingdom to record Local &/Or General, Models had made some demo recordings, which proved successful enough to be released as an EP, Cut Lunch in June. One track, "Man o' Action", from that EP was re-recorded for Local &/or General. The album provided two singles, "Local and/or General" in November and "Unhappy" in 1982, neither peaked into the Australian Top 50 singles chart.

Track listing

Personnel
Credited to:

Musicians
Models 
 Andrew Duffield — keyboards, EMS Synthi AKS
 Mark Ferrie — bass guitar
 Janis Freidenfelds (a.k.a. Johnny Crash) — percussion, traps, syncussion
 Sean Kelly — guitar, clarinet, vocals

Production 
 Producer — Stephen W Tayler, Models
 Engineer — Stephen W Tayler, Tony Cohen 
 Mix Engineer: Stephen W Tayler
 Re-mix — Steve Brown
 Artwork — Roy Snell
 Photography — Anton Corbijn

In pop culture
The album gives its title to the name of a radio program focussing on new Australian music on Melbourne radio station Triple R.

Television music quiz program RocKwiz has a round on general music knowledge titled "Local and/or General" after the album.

References

1981 albums
Models (band) albums
Mushroom Records albums